Otjombinde Constituency is an electoral constituency in the Omaheke Region of Namibia. It had 6,378 inhabitants in 2004 and 4,879 registered voters . The district capital of the constituency is the settlement of Otjombinde, its main economic hub is Talismanus. The constituency forms part of the border between Namibia and Botswana, it contains the settlements of Eiseb, Helena, and Rietfontein. 

The constituency is inhabited by Ovambanderu and San people. San settlements include Donkerbos and Sonneblom.

Politics
The 2015 regional election was won by Katjanna Kaurivi, an independent candidate, with 1,396 votes. Karri Marenga of the SWAPO Party finished second with 681 votes, followed by Jeremiah Ndjoze of the South West Africa National Union (SWANU) with 267 votes and Lukas Katjiremba of the Democratic Turnhalle Alliance (DTA) with 134 votes. The 2020 regional election was won by Wenzel Kavaka (SWAPO) who obtained 911 votes. Bethuel Mbuende (SWANU) came second with 685 votes, followed by Edwardt Hiangoro of the Landless People's Movement (LPM, a new party registered in 2018, 390 votes) and Werner Kambato of the National Unity Democratic Organisation (NUDO, 326 votes).

References

Constituencies of Omaheke Region
States and territories established in 1992
1992 establishments in Namibia